The Clássico Alvinegro (which is Portuguese for Black & White derby) is the name of the Corinthians and Santos football rivalry. These are widely regarded as two of the biggest teams in the state of São Paulo, and among the biggest in Brazil. The Derby dates from back from 1913, and since then, there has been pronounced tension between the clubs and it has been a decider for championship tournaments, namely the finals of the 2002 Campeonato Brasileiro Serie A. It is one of the biggest Derbies in the State of São Paulo.

Statistics

Source: Futpedia

General
347 Matches
136 Wins - Corinthians
111 Wins - Santos
100 Draws
Corinthians goals: 598
Santos goals: 514
Last Match: Santos 0–1 Corinthians (Campeonato Brasileiro, 22 October 2022)

Campeonato Brasileiro
Includes Torneio Roberto Gomes Pedrosa
72 Matches
25 Wins - Corinthians
24 Wins - Santos
23 Draws
Corinthians goals: 86
Santos goals: 84
Last Match: Santos 0–1 Corinthians (Campeonato Brasileiro, 22 October 2022)

Copa Libertadores
2 Matches
1 Win - Corinthians
0 Wins - Santos
1 Draw
Corinthians goals: 2
Santos goals: 1
Last Match: Corinthians 1–1 Santos (Libertadores, 20 June 2012)

Copa do Brasil
4 Matches
1 Wins - Corinthians
3 Wins - Santos
0 Draw
Corinthians goals: 5
Santos goals: 5
Last Match: Santos 1–0 Corinthians (Copa do Brasil, 13 July 2022)

Other
Largest victories:
Corinthians 5–0 Santos (21 September 1919) - Paulista League
Santos 0–11 Corinthians (20 July 1920) - Paulista League
Corinthians 6–1 Santos (5 June 1921) - Paulista League
Corinthians 6–2 Santos (19 November 1922) - Paulista League
Corinthians 6–1 Santos (8 June 1924) - Paulista League
Santos 8–3 Corinthians (18 March 1927) - Paulista League
Corinthians 6–2 Santos (4 January 1931) - Paulista League
Santos 7–1 Corinthians (8 May 1932) - Paulista League
Corinthians 0–6 Santos (24 September 1933) - Paulista League
Corinthians 5–1 Santos (24 May 1936) - Paulista League
Corinthians 7–0 Santos (1 June 1941) - Paulista League
Corinthians 6–2 Santos (26 July 1942) - Paulista League
Santos 6–1 Corinthians (7 December 1958) - Paulista League
Santos 6–1 Corinthians (30 November 1960) - Paulista League
Santos 6–1 Corinthians (16 August 1961) - Paulista League
Corinthians 4–0 Santos (29 May 1977) - Paulista League
Corinthians 5–1 Santos (16 August 1987) - Paulista League
Corinthians 5–1 Santos ( 23 May 1999) - Paulista League
Corinthians 5–1 Santos (19 March 2000) - Paulista League
Corinthians 5–0 Santos (18 March 2001) - Paulista League
Santos 5–1 Corinthians (29 January 2014) - Paulista League
Santos 4–0 Corinthians (26 November 1972) - Campeonato Brasileiro
Corinthians 4–0 Santos (20 February 1994) - Campeonato Brasileiro
Corinthians 7–1 Santos (6 November 2005) - Campeonato Brasileiro

Titles comparison

Note (1): Although the Intercontinental Cup and the FIFA Club World Cup are officially different tournaments, in Brazil they are treated many times as the same tournament. 

 Note (2): Despite some sources says that they are two distinct titles, the Intercontinental Champions' Supercup and the Supercopa Sul-Americana dos Campeões Intercontinentais, the latter was just a phase of the Intercontinental Champions' Supercup. CONMEBOL recognizes only one title, the Intercontinental Champions' Supercup.

References

External links
 Futpédia 

Brazilian football derbies
Santos FC
Sport Club Corinthians Paulista